The West Oakland Food Collaborative is a food and nutrition activism organization, founded in 2001, in Oakland, California. It was organized by the Environmental Justice Institute and other agencies, and the residents of West Oakland, to provide better access to high quality, affordable foods for the neighborhood.

The Collaborative's five areas of focus are: the Mandela Farmers Market, neighborhood greening, fresh food availability at corner/convenience stores, the Soul Foods Cooperative, and microbusiness development

See also
 List of food cooperatives

References

External links
website

Organizations based in Oakland, California
Consumer rights organizations
Food cooperatives in the United States
Companies established in 2001
2001 establishments in California